The Moléson (French: Le Moléson) is a mountain of the Swiss Prealps, overlooking the region of Gruyères in the canton of Fribourg. It lies at the northern end of the chain between Lake Geneva and the valley of the Sarine.

Climate

See also
List of mountains of Switzerland accessible by public transport

References

External links
 Moléson on Hikr
 Moléson cable car

Bernese Alps
Mountains of the Alps
Two-thousanders of Switzerland
Mountains of the canton of Fribourg
Mountains of Switzerland